Edward Caleb Babcock (January 10, 1872 – June 28, 1936) was an American wrestler. He competed in the men's freestyle featherweight at the 1904 Summer Olympics.

References

External links
 

1872 births
1936 deaths
American male sport wrestlers
Olympic wrestlers of the United States
Wrestlers at the 1904 Summer Olympics